Lake Ellen Wilson is located in Glacier National Park, in the U. S. state of Montana. A series of cascades including Beaver Chief Falls can be found between the two lakes.

See also
List of lakes in Flathead County, Montana (A-L)

References

Ellen Wilson
Ellen Wilson